Ali Manyakis is an adventure story arc of the Philippine comic strip series Pugad Baboy, created by Pol Medina, Jr. and originally published in the Philippine Daily Inquirer. This particular story arc lasts 35 strips long. In 1997, the story arc was reprinted in Pugad Baboy Eight, the eighth book compilation of the comic strip series. Manyakis is a loanword borrowed from the English word "maniac", and is used to refer to a person with uncontrollable sexual urges.

Synopsis
Sergeant Tomas is subjecting the female civilian employees in his base headquarters office to unwarranted advances and conversation bordering on sexual harassment when their new Squadron Commander, Lieutenant Colonel Violeta Kainam arrives to take command. She immediately institutes a series of buzzer codes to summon specific personnel to her office, much to Tomas' disgust. Later, Col. Kainam invites Tomas to accompany her that evening to see the film Disclosure, but Tomas makes excuses. Undeterred, Kainam still manages to get Tomas into her car. She hands him her service firearm, a .357 Magnum revolver, and threatens to have him arrested at a COMELEC checkpoint since an election-related gun ban was in effect, if he refuses to go on a date with her. Out of desperation, Tomas hails a police officer manning the checkpoint and pointedly shows him the weapon, shouting that it did not have the necessary permit to be carried.

Sexual harassment
The next day presumably, the Colonel was dictating an official communication to Tomas when she began to scratch herself uncontrollably, until she rips her blouse open in the presence of Tomas, telling him to "scratch my itch". She then locks the door to her office and begins to advanced upon the horrified Tomas, who at first, aims his service pistol at the Colonel, and later climbs unto the window sill and threatens to jump out. Colonel Kainam reminds him they were three floors up. Tomas replies that it doesn't matter, as he had attended Airborne training. He soon jumps out and lands on a plot planted with pineapple, acquiring numerous wounds and scratches all over his body as a result.

Later, Tomas confides to Noli that he needs a lawyer to pursue his sexual harassment case against his commanding officer. Noli needed a bit of convincing that Tomas was the victim, especially when taking Tomas's womanizing habits into consideration, but he soon introduces Attorney Adriano to Tomas (who also displays the same reaction as Noli when Tomas points himself out as the harassed). The lawyer conducts a preliminary investigation into the case, but soon pronounces it indefensible, due to Tomas' previous actions that may be given a negative spin by the accused's defense. Tomas has no choice but to accept the status quo.

Hidden agenda 
The Colonel later orders Tomas to sign the delivery receipt for a French Mirage fighter plane valued at 38 million USD. When Tomas refuses to sign the document, since he could not verify its delivery, Col. Kainam threatens to pursue an attempted rape and grave threats suit against him. Tomas, wanting no part in defrauding the government, seeks Noli's aid once again, and Noli has the bright idea of breaking into the Colonel's computer to discover her hidden agenda.

Noli produces Boyet Pipino, whom he describes as a "Computer Whiz of the Decade". Boyet Pipino initially stood aloof from the task, saying that he was not a hacker and that it was against his principles to break into someone else's computer. He however, changes his mind when Tomas ridicules him as a "fake". He tries several combinations of words associated with the Colonel as passwords and soon hits the jackpot by using the reverse spelling of her surname, "maniak". Browsing through the computer files they at first see nothing but games and some porn. Upon accessing Kainam's e-mail correspondence though, they discover that she was in cahoots with a certain politician who was amassing campaign funds. They also find a balance sheet listing a series of amounts that suspiciously mirrored the amounts of money seized at various bank robberies since the election campaign began. They conclude that Kainam was involved in the robberies as well. Before Pipino could print the balance sheet, they lost power and Kainam steps into the room armed with a machine pistol, saying that she had tripped off the circuit breaker.

Endgame
As Tomas and Noli tell Kainam that her game was now up, and that everyone would know her true agenda, she counters by bragging that nobody discovered that she and her cohorts were also responsible for the late Senator Benigno Aquino Jr.'s assassination. As she was about to name the group's mastermind, Tomas suddenly hits her over the head with the computer's system unit, causing her to lapse into amnesia.

Tomas decides to report everything to higher authorities, even though Noli discourages him. His report is dismissed by his immediate superior, who pronounced it as "preposterous".

Trivia
 This is Attorney Adriano's first appearance in a story arc; he would appear again in Matrona. This character is based on Attorney Adriano Lecaros, one of Pugad Baboy, Inc.'s directors.
 Boyet Pipino is based on another Pugad Baboy, Inc. director, Boyet Espino. Pipino is Filipino for cucumber.
 Attorney Adriano quotes from the Michael Crichton novel Disclosure: "Sexual harassment is not about sex, it's about power."
 Boyet, Tomas and Noli find numerous Personal computer games in Col. Kainam's machine, among of which include: Doom, Doom II, Rebel Assault, Jane of the Jungle, Lemmings and Prince of Persia. Tomas initially suspects that the first three are plans for counter-insurgency operations.
 When Col. Kainam is hit over the head with the computer's system unit, she lapses into amnesia, but then remembers, erroneously and not stated explicitly, that she is Miriam Defensor Santiago. The "fungus-faced President" she refers to is then-Philippine President Fidel V. Ramos.
 Col. Kainam's computer was equipped with the Intel 80486 microprocessor.
 Tomas catches on to the ghost purchase when Kainam says that there is no Mirage fighter on the flight line because it is a mirage.
 Tomas' chauvinism rears its head once more when he objects to the entry of Kainam. He says in Tagalog, "Sir, I already have a female commander at home (Barbie); do I need to have another here at the office?" (Note:refer to the above image for the original dialogue.)
 Kainam's sudden cut-off by Tomas just as she was about to reveal the name of the brains behind Ninoy's assassination is an oblique reference to the fact that the mastermind has not been unmasked for many years now.
 On the epilogue, Tomas was chastised by an officer who claimed the info he gave was preposterous, which he claimed that he got from H World. H World was known to sow fake info.
 Mirage III is the name of the plane Kainam used as an excuse to plunder money, but used as a pun in which the plane is "phantom".

Pugad Baboy